Ollie Charles Vanek (August 23, 1908 — June 29, 2000) was an American professional baseball player, manager and scout. He is best known as the talent-spotter who discovered future Baseball Hall of Famer Stan Musial for the St. Louis Cardinals and encouraged the team to switch Musial from his initial position, a left-handed pitcher, to the outfield — paving the way for Musial's brilliant career as a batsman.

Vanek was an outfielder and third baseman during his minor league playing career from 1930–32 and 1937–46, batting .312 in 1,195 games. In 1937, Vanek was the player-manager of the Monessen Cardinals of the Class D Pennsylvania State Association, one of the many teams in the Cardinals' extensive farm system. Musial, a 16-year-old high-schooler from nearby Donora, Pennsylvania, tried out for Vanek before a game and Vanek recommended that the parent club sign him. The following season, Musial began his professional career in the Cardinal system as a southpaw pitcher and part-time outfielder.

When a sore shoulder (suffered making a catch in the field) derailed Musial's mound career, Vanek, in 1941, made him a full-time outfielder for his Class C Springfield Cardinals of the Western Association, and Musial responded by hitting .379 with 26 home runs in little more than half a season. By the end of 1941, he had begun his legendary Major League Baseball career with the big-league Cardinals. "Ollie was an excellent hitter and a good player," Musial said upon Vanek's death in St. Louis at age 91 in 2000. " ... He was a good man and responsible for my start in St. Louis."

Vanek managed Cardinal farm teams for 12 seasons, 1937–48, then became a scout for St. Louis, and, later, the New York Mets, where he won the Gil Hodges Award for Meritorious Service.

References

External links
 Career statistics, from Baseball Reference

1908 births
2000 deaths
Allentown Cardinals players
Asheville Tourists players
Baseball players from Illinois
Burlington Bees players
Decatur Commodores players
Greensburg Green Sox players
Johnson City Cardinals players
Lynchburg Cardinals players
Minor league baseball managers
New York Mets scouts
St. Louis Cardinals scouts
Springfield Cardinals players
Williamson Red Birds players
Place of birth missing
Baseball players from St. Louis